Cha Jong-Hyok (born 25 September 1985) is a North Korean international football player, who last played for FC Wil.

Club career 

Cha played for Amrokgang in the DPR Korea League from 2005 to 2010. He helped them to the League title in 2007, but the number of games he has played and goals he has scored for them is still unknown. On 27 June 2010, Cha signed a contract with Swiss Challenge League team FC Wil. Cha spent 5 seasons with the Swiss club, making 113 league appearances and scoring 2 goals.

International career 
Cha has been a part of the National team since 2005, and has won 43 caps for them. He played an integral part of the North Korea team that qualified for the 2010 FIFA World Cup in South Africa and started as right-back in their opening match against Brazil on 15 June.

References

External links
 

1985 births
Living people
North Korean expatriate sportspeople in Switzerland
North Korean footballers
North Korea international footballers
Amnokgang Sports Club players
2010 FIFA World Cup players
2011 AFC Asian Cup players
2015 AFC Asian Cup players
Expatriate footballers in Switzerland
Swiss Challenge League players
FC Wil players
Footballers at the 2006 Asian Games

Association football fullbacks
Asian Games competitors for North Korea